Lie to Me is an American crime drama television series that premiered on the Fox network on January 21, 2009. The series follows Dr. Cal Lightman (Tim Roth) and his colleagues at The Lightman Group, as they solve crimes using applied psychology by interpreting microexpressions (through the Facial Action Coding System) and body language.

On May 11, 2011, Fox canceled Lie to Me after three seasons.

Series overview
{| class="wikitable plainrowheaders" style="text-align:center;"
|-
! colspan="2" rowspan="2" |Season
! rowspan="2" |Episodes
! colspan="2" |Originally aired
|-
! First aired
! Last aired
|-
| bgcolor="143658" | 
| 1
| 13
| January 21, 2009
| May 13, 2009
|-
| bgcolor="6A9F9F" | 
| 2
| 22
| September 28, 2009
| September 13, 2010
|-
| bgcolor="006600" | 
| 3
| 13
| October 4, 2010
| January 31, 2011
|-
|}

Episodes

Season 1 (2009)

Season 2 (2009–10)

Season 3 (2010–11)

References

External links 
 
 Lie to Me episodes information at film.com
 List of Lie to Me episodes at TVGuide.com
 

 
Lists of American crime drama television series episodes